The Manteca Waterslides was a water park that existed in the Central Valley town of Manteca, California from 1974 to 2004. Founded by R.H. "Budge" Brown, the park enjoyed status as one of the better waterparks in the United States and had easy access to Interstate 5. Also known as Oakwood Lake, it was familiar to central valley park-goers for its massive drop-down slide "V-Max".

In the summer of 2004, it was announced that the park would be closed.  The owners of the park cited high workers' compensation and health care costs as reasons for the park's closure in September 2004.

As of April 2008, the site of the old waterpark lies underwater due to the expansion of Oakwood Lake and the surrounding land is being proposed for development which would provide housing for, among other people, commuters to the San Francisco Bay Area.
 
In 2010, there was talk of a developer buying the land bringing back the water park.

Manteca Waterslides was home to Oakwood Lake Amphitheatre, a venue primarily used for concerts.

See also
 List of water parks

References

 It's Slip Sliding Away, Manteca Bulletin, September 27, 2004.
 Going out of work: Loss of summer jobs saddest part of Manteca Waterslides taking its last ride. Stockton Record, May 28, 2004.

External links
 Facebook group The late and great Oakwood Lake Employees

Water parks in California
Buildings and structures in San Joaquin County, California
Defunct amusement parks in California
1974 establishments in California
2004 disestablishments in California